The 2005 Major League Soccer season was the tenth season of Major League Soccer. The season began on April 2, 2005, and concluded on November 13, 2005 with the first Supporters' Shield victory for the San Jose Earthquakes and a second MLS Cup victory for the Los Angeles Galaxy.

Changes from 2004 season
At the previous MLS Cup, two new expansion franchises were announced to start play in 2005, Real Salt Lake (based at Rice-Eccles Stadium in Salt Lake City, Utah) and Club Deportivo Chivas USA (based at the Home Depot Center in Carson, California).
Because there were now more teams in the west than in the east, the Kansas City Wizards moved to the Eastern Conference.
The Dallas Burn re-branded as FC Dallas.

2005 in Summary
The New England Revolution and FC Dallas began the year as the league's dominant teams, especially when Dallas acquired Carlos Ruiz in a trade after Landon Donovan returned from a disappointing stint with Bayer Leverkusen and wanted to play with his hometown Los Angeles Galaxy. Injuries and inconsistent play slowed FC Dallas down as the season wore on, and the 2001 and 2003 MLS Cup champion San Jose Earthquakes eventually won the regular-season Supporters' Shield with the third-best record in the league's 10-year history. FC Dallas opened its new stadium, Pizza Hut Park, in August, although it did not operate at full capacity until November. As he did at the Home Depot Center, Ruiz scored the first two goals in the new stadium in a 2-2 tie against the MetroStars.

Expansion franchises Real Salt Lake and Chivas USA struggled in their first season, making playoff qualification a routine matter for the other four Western Conference teams. Chivas USA proved a disappointment in terms of consistent attendance, but its derbies against Los Angeles added excitement and intensity to the calendar, even though the Galaxy won all five (four regular season and one U.S. Open Cup) meetings. Real Salt Lake finished second in the league in attendance.

The MetroStars fired head coach Bob Bradley late in the season and qualified for the playoffs with a 2-0 win over Chivas USA on the final day of the season. Their campaign was boosted by former French international Youri Djorkaeff, who proved one of the league's most successful international signings and took over as MetroStars captain.

In the playoffs, Western Conference No. 4 seed Los Angeles knocked off rival San Jose behind inspired play from former Earthquake Donovan. Colorado edged Dallas on penalty kicks after a classic overtime that saw each team score in overtime and Ruiz hit the post with a penalty kick. In the Eastern Conference, New England rallied from a 2-0 aggregate deficit with three goals in the game's final 25 minutes to beat the MetroStars in snowy Gillette Stadium. Defending champion D.C. United crashed out after a 4-0 home loss to the Chicago Fire.

In the conference finals, Donovan scored twice to lead the Galaxy past Colorado, and an early Clint Dempsey goal carried New England into the final. Fire players thought they had tied the game in stoppage time, but a linesman's controversial offside call (proven correct by video replay) denied them the equalizer.

For the second time in four years, Los Angeles beat New England 1-0 in overtime to win MLS Cup. Maligned Guatemalan forward Pando Ramirez, whose only goal on the season came on a penalty kick that hit the post and went in off Joe Cannon's back, scored the game's only goal before a sellout crowd at Pizza Hut Park.

Final standings

Eastern Conference

Western Conference

Overall

MLS Cup Playoffs

Bracket

Conference Semifinals 

New England Revolution advance 3-2 on aggregate.

Chicago Fire advance 4-0 on aggregate.

Los Angeles Galaxy advance 4-2 on aggregate.

Colorado Rapids advance 5-4 on penalties (2-2 on aggregate).

Conference finals

MLS Cup 2005

Conference champions New England Revolution and Los Angeles Galaxyearn MLS berths to CONCACAF Champions' Cup 2006.

Team Awards
MLS Cup: Los Angeles Galaxy
U.S. Open Cup: Los Angeles Galaxy
MLS Supporters' Shield: San Jose Earthquakes
MLS Reserve Division: D.C. United

Individual awards

Top Goal Scorers

Goal-Scoring Totals

Team Attendance Totals

Coaches

Eastern Conference
D.C. United: Piotr Nowak
Kansas City Wizards: Bob Gansler

Western Conference
Chivas USA: Thomas Rongen
FC Dallas: Colin Clarke
Real Salt Lake: John Ellinger
San Jose Earthquakes: Dominic Kinnear

References

 
Major League Soccer seasons
1